National Institute of Textile Engineering and Research is also known as NITER. Located in Savar, Dhaka District, it is one of the largest undergraduate textile engineering campus in Bangladesh. It offers the Bachelor of Science in Engineering degree in textile engineering, industrial and production engineering, fashion design and apparel engineering, computer science engineering and electrical and electronic engineering in co-ordination with the University of Dhaka. Furthermore it starts M.Sc. in Textile Engineering course under the Faculty of Engineering & Technology and MBA in Textile & Apparel Value Chain under the faculty of Business Studies of the University of Dhaka.

The institute is a partnership between the Bangladesh Textile Mills Association (BTMA) and the Ministry of Textiles and Jute, Govt. of Bangladesh. It is a public-private partnership education and research organization and a constituent institute of the University of Dhaka.

History
In the late 1970s, the public textile mills under the Bangladesh Textile Mills Corporation (BTMC) were operating at a loss. BTMC knew it needed skilled personnel to turn the mills around. To that end, and to serve the mills' testing and consulting needs, in 1979 it established a training institute at Savar, the Textile Industry Development Centre (TIDC). For the first five years, the United Nations Development Programme (UNDP), through the United Nations Industrial Development Organization (UNIDO), supported infrastructure, curriculum development, and staff training at TIDC.

In 1994 TIDC's name changed to National Institute of Textile Training Research and Design (NITTRAD). Later the Ministry of Textiles and Jute decided to run NITTRAD under public–private partnership (PPP) and handed over its operational management to Bangladesh Textile Mills Association (BTMA) under the Ministry of Textile and Jute. From 1 January 2013, the Ministry of Textiles and Jute, according to a suggestion from the University of Dhaka, changed the name of the institute to National Institute of Textile Engineering and Research. From 2010 to 2011 session NITER started Bachelor of Science in Textile engineering course under the University of Dhaka. It was initiated by the then president of BTMA, Mr. Abdul Hai Sarkar.

It also provides practical and training classes of textile engineering to students of private universities in Bangladesh.

Academic
Undergraduate Programs:
B.Sc. in Textile Engineering(TE)
B.Sc. in Industrial and Production Engineering (IPE)
B.Sc. in Fashion Design and Apparel Engineering (FDAE)
B.Sc. in Computer Science and Engineering (CSE)
B.Sc. in Electrical and Electronics Engineering (EEE)
Graduate Programs:
M.Sc. in Textile Engineering
MBA in Textile & Apparel Value Chain

Collaboration

NITER has academic and research collaboration with following institutes:
 Wuhan Textile University, China
 University of Bolton, United Kingdom
 , Germany
 UNIDO
 Deutsche Gesellschaft für Internationale Zusammenarbeit (GIZ)

References

External links
 

Universities and colleges in Dhaka
Textile schools in Bangladesh
Research institutes in Bangladesh
Educational institutions established in 1979